Crotalaria verrucosa, the blue rattlepod, is a species of flowering plant in the legume family, Fabaceae. This shrub belongs to the subfamily Faboideae. The herb found in Bangladesh, China, Cambodia, India, Indonesia, Laos, Malaysia, Myanmar, Nepal, Philippines, Sri Lanka, Thailand, Vietnam; Australasia and Africa and Americas regions.

Crotalaria verrucosa is a perennial shrub that grows to about 50 to 100 cm in height.

Image gallery

References

External links

verrucosa